HD 173791 (HR 7065) is a solitary yellow hued star located in the southern constellation Telescopium. It has an apparent magnitude of 5.80, allowing it to be viewed with the naked eye under suitable viewing conditions.

This is a red giant with a stellar classification of G8 III. It is currently on the cool end of the horizontal branch, fusing helium at its core. At present it has 1.31 times the mass of the Sun but has expanded to 10.3 times its girth.

References

Telescopium (constellation)
G-type giants
092367
173791
Durchmusterung objects
Telescopium, 30
7065